Sunfest is the name used for several music and art festivals:

 SunFest, West Palm Beach, Florida
 Sunfest (London, Ontario)
 Sunfest, Bartlesville, Oklahoma
 Sunfest, Bucharest, Romania
 Sunfest (Gimli, Manitoba)